Abdullah Al Arraf  (born 3 June 1995) is a Saudi Arabian professional footballer who currently plays for Al-Ansar as a goalkeeper .

Honours
Al-Wehda
Prince Mohammad bin Salman League: 2017–18

References

External links 
 

1995 births
Living people
Sportspeople from Mecca
Saudi Arabia youth international footballers
Saudi Arabian footballers
Al-Wehda Club (Mecca) players
Al-Taawoun FC players
Najran SC players
Al-Taqadom FC players
Al-Jubail Club players
Al-Ansar FC (Medina) players
Saudi First Division League players
Saudi Professional League players
Saudi Third Division players
Saudi Second Division players
Footballers at the 2014 Asian Games
Association football goalkeepers
Asian Games competitors for Saudi Arabia
21st-century Saudi Arabian people
20th-century Saudi Arabian people